Poisieux is a commune in the Cher department in the Centre-Val de Loire region of France.

It is a small farming village situated by the banks of the river Arnon.

Population

Sights
 The church, dating from the nineteenth century.
 The chateau of Mazières.

See also
Communes of the Cher department

References

Communes of Cher (department)